Jan Enjebo (born 14 February 1958) is a Swedish basketball player. He competed in the men's tournament at the 1980 Summer Olympics.

References

External links
 

1958 births
Living people
Swedish men's basketball players
Olympic basketball players of Sweden
Basketball players at the 1980 Summer Olympics
Sportspeople from Stockholm